Benny is a pejorative term used by year-round residents of the Jersey Shore to describe stereotypically rude, flashy, loud tourists from North Jersey and New York.

Origin
The origin of the term is disputed. One common theory says the term originates from an acronym that was stamped on the beachgoers' train tickets, representing the city in which they boarded the train to the Jersey Shore: Bayonne, Elizabeth, Newark, and New York City. The term "Benny" may also originate from the early 20th century practice of wealthy New Yorkers taking trips to the Jersey Shore as treatment for myriad maladies such as anemia, hemophilia, and hysteria. These therapeutic trips were called "beneficials" by doctors and patients. Often, visitors would claim to be at the Jersey Shore on a "beneficial", hence the term Benny.  "Benny" refers to Ben Franklin, whose picture is on the $100 bill. Still another theory refers to off-shore boat racing during the 1970s sponsored by the restaurant chain "Benihana's".

The term 'Shoobie' is used by residents of resort communities in the southern New Jersey Shore, from Long Beach Island to Cape May. The term shoobie was originally used to describe day-trippers who took the train to the shore. The train offered pre-packed lunches that came in shoe boxes; hence the term "shoobie." However, over time the meaning has changed to include tourists who wear sneakers or shoes on the beach, as opposed to most locals who go barefoot on the sand.

References

External links
BENNY (acronym) on The Free Dictionary
The origins of the "Benny"

Jersey Shore
Pejorative terms for in-group non-members
New Jersey culture